Woking Football Club is a professional association football club, based in Woking, Surrey, England. Founded in 1887, the club plays its home matches at The Laithwaite Community Stadium and is nicknamed the Cardinals, often shortened to the Cards. Currently, they compete in  having been promoted from the National League South in the 2018–19 season.

History

Early years
Woking Football Club was founded in 1887. The club joined the West Surrey League in 1895–96, winning the title by one point. However, within 21 years of being formed, the club was in danger of folding for financial reasons. The turning point came when, in January 1908, Woking played Bolton Wanderers in the First Round of the FA Cup, having made it through five qualifying rounds. Despite losing the away game 5–0, the club made it into the national news. Bolton Wanderers, impressed by the minnows they had defeated, travelled to Woking for a friendly match the following season, which kept the club solvent.

Isthmian League years
In 1911 the club joined the Isthmian League, maintaining their place in the top division for 72 years and finishing as runners-up to Wycombe Wanderers in 1956–57. That achievement was eclipsed the following season when, in front of a 71,000 crowd, Woking beat Ilford 3–0 to win the 1958 F.A. Amateur Cup final, the last to be televised live.

The club then went into decline, culminating in a first-ever relegation in 1982–83. By the end of the 1984–85 season the club had plunged to Division Two South of the Isthmian League. It was during that season that former player, Geoff Chapple, was appointed as manager. However, Chapple was not able to save the club from relegation. The following season, the club just missed out on promotion at the first attempt. However, the club clinched the Division Two South title in 1986–87 and, after two third-place finishes in Division One, they were promoted back to the Premier Division at the end of the 1989–90 season.

FA Cup glory
During the 1990–91 season, the club reached the fourth round of the FA Cup. Woking beat three Conference sides to set up a third round away tie at Second Division side West Bromwich Albion. After trailing 1–0 at half time, Woking went on to win 4–2, with Tim Buzaglo scoring a hat-trick. In the Fourth Round, the club was drawn against First Division Everton. The tie was originally going to be played at Woking, however the venue was switched to Everton's home ground, Goodison Park. Woking narrowly lost the match 1–0 to a Kevin Sheedy goal.

Promotion to the Conference and FA Trophy success

Promotion to the Conference was achieved in 1991–92. The Isthmian League title was clinched in early April, with seven games still to be played, 18 points clear of nearest rivals, Enfield. The next season saw Woking finish the season in eighth position. The following summer saw Chapple sign former Chelsea, Sunderland, Fulham and QPR winger, Clive Walker, from Brighton & Hove Albion and he was to prove the catalyst in the most successful period in the club's history. Woking won the FA Trophy for the first time in 1994, defeating Runcorn in the final at Wembley; the following season they became only the second club to win back-to-back FA Trophies (after Scarborough in 1976–77), defeating Kidderminster Harriers in the final. A third FA Trophy triumph followed in 1997, with Dagenham & Redbridge the opponents in the final. The Cards also achieved five successive top-five finishes in the Conference, including being runners-up in 1994–95 and 1995–96 when they finished below Stevenage. The club also continued to enjoy national prominence in the FA Cup. Barnet were defeated in successive seasons following draws at their homeground. In 1996–97 a run in the FA Cup saw the club beat Millwall, then top of Division Two, and Cambridge United, who were challenging for promotion from Division Three. The Third Round saw Woking draw 1–1 away to Premier League side Coventry City, thanks to a last minute equaliser from the Cards' Steve Thompson, but Coventry won the replay at Kingfield 2–1.

At the end of the 1996–97 campaign, having just clinched the FA Trophy for the third time, Geoff Chapple and his coach, Colin Lippiatt, left the club and joined Kingstonian. This was the beginning of a less successful period for the club. John McGovern and then Brian McDermott were given the position of manager, but neither achieved anything greater than a mid-table finish. After McDermott, Colin Lippiatt returned but fared little better. He was replaced by his former boss as Geoff Chapple too came back to Woking. Lippiatt departed in January 2002 and Glenn Cockerill joined as Chapple's assistant. This season ended with the club just one place above the relegation places. In the meantime very significant events had taken place off the field. The downturn in the club's fortunes had led to a financial crisis. With the club facing administration or worse, local businessman and long-time fan Chris Ingram bought the club, becoming chairman in February 2002 with an aim of trying to increase the club's income and to secure its long-term financial stability.

Cockerill took over as manager later that year, and oversaw a relative period of stability for the club, before he was sacked shortly before the end of the 2006–07 season. An unimpressive campaign under the management of Frank Gray followed in 2007–08, before a disastrous 2008–09 season which saw three men (Kim Grant, Phil Gilchrist and Graham Baker) take charge of the club, eventually resulted in the club's relegation to the Conference South. That summer, a supporters' trust took over the running of the club. Woking finished 5th in their first Conference South season, but lost to Bath City in the play-off final. The following season saw Woking struggling to challenge for promotion, and Graham Baker was sacked halfway through the campaign for suggesting that the fans were expecting too much of the team.

Garry Hill era (2011–2017)
Garry Hill took over as manager and improved the team's form, eventually resulting in another fifth-place finish, only for the club to get knocked out in the play-off semi-finals this time against Farnborough. In April 2012, having beaten Maidenhead United 0–1 with Giuseppe Sole scoring for a record breaking ninth game in a row, Woking were promoted to the Conference Premier, winning the Conference South with two games to spare. They eventually reached 97 points, beating second placed Dartford by nine points.

After five seasons in the National League (formerly Conference Premier), Woking acrimoniously parted company with Garry Hill after six-and-a-half years at the helm.

Relegation and return to the National League (2017–)
The club appointed former Southampton and West Ham United under-23s coach Anthony Limbrick in May 2017, which saw the club take another step to becoming full-time again, with players training three times a week. Despite a good run in the 2017–18 FA Cup, Woking's league form suffered, which culminated in just three league wins between October 2017 and April 2018. Limbrick was subsequently relieved of his duties just 11 months into a three-year contract, leaving assistant manager Jason Goodliffe to take over the managerial reins (aided by former Aldershot Town coach Matt Gray) to preserve The Cards' National League status with just five games remaining. However, Woking's fate was eventually sealed on the final day of the season after a 2–1 home defeat against Dover Athletic.

On 16 May 2018, and after much speculation, the club finally confirmed the appointment of former Kingstonian and Hampton & Richmond Borough manager Alan Dowson. Woking returned to the National League in 2019 at the first time of asking following a 1–0 win over Welling United in National League South Play-Off Final. During this promotion season, Woking reached the third round of the FA Cup. Woking had beaten League Two side Swindon Town before losing out to Premier League side Watford 2–0.

The following season, Woking finished in 10th place back in the National League following the decision to stop the season in March 2020 due to the disruption caused by the COVID-19 pandemic. In the 2020–21 National League season, Woking finished 20th.

On 28 February 2022, Dowson was sacked by the club following a "prolonged run of poor form in the league", ending his four-year association with the Surrey-based side. Dowson informed local paper SurreyLive that the club had sacked him in a 20 second phone call and he would never return to Woking. Due to the circumstances of how Dowson was sacked board members Rosemary Johnson and Kelvin Reay resigned. Ian Dyer the assistant manager took charge of the club as caretaker manager.

On 28 March 2022, former Yeovil Town manager Darren Sarll was appointed until the end of the 2023–24 season, with Ian Dyer remaining as his assistant

Stadium
Woking play their home games at Kingfield Stadium (currently The Laithwaite Community Stadium for sponsorship reasons), Kingfield Road, Woking, GU22 9AA.

Different stands of Woking FC stadium:

The KRE: This is the main home terrace and usually where the best atmosphere is found. It runs along one end of the pitch. The terrace is covered by a roof.

The Leslie Goodson stand: This stand is the largest stand of the stadium and is located opposite to the KRE. The LGS is an all seater stand consisting of around 2,000 seats. A quarter of this stand is usually given to away fans.

The Chris lane terrace: The Chris lane terrace is a large terrace without a roof and is reserved for away fans. The terrace runs a whole length of the pitch.

Moaners corner: Moaners corner is one of three stands on the opposite side of the pitch to the Chris lane terrace. It’s a small terrace stand without a roof. The fans who stand in the terrace are usually veteran fans.

Directors Box: The directors box is a small stand that the directors of the club sit, this is also where the commentary box is. This stand is located in between moaners corner and the family stand

The Family stand: The family stand is located next to the directors box and is an all-seater stand usually consisting of families.

Mascot
Woking F.C. has a team mascot called K.C Kat.

Rivalries
For many years Woking's main rivals have been Stevenage and Aldershot Town, where games attract larger than average crowds. Stevenage are Woking's historic rivals due to animosity in the 1990s, while the rivalry with Aldershot is a more recent rivalry due to locality. Torquay United have also become minor rivals due to intense games and competition when they were relegated to the national league south together, altercations between fans has also helped feed this new rivalry.

Aldershot Town
Aldershot Town and Woking have met competitively on 34 occasions. Aldershot Town have won 18 times, Woking 9 times and there has been 7 drawn matches.

Players

Current squad

Out on loan

Seasons

Managerial history
A list of Woking FC managers from 1984 onwards.

Club officials
{|class="wikitable"
|-
!Position
!Club Official
|-
|Chief Executive / Director|| John Katz
|-
|rowspan="3"| Directors|| Graeme Beveridge
|-
|Drew Volpe
|-
|Dave Curtis
|-
|Club Secretary / Cards Trust Fans' Representative|| George Burnett
|-
|Honorary Vice President of the Cards|| Peter Jordan
|-

Management team

{|class="wikitable"
|-
!Position
!Staff
|-
|Manager|| Darren Sarll
|-
|Assistant Manager|| Ian Dyer
|-
|Head of Sports Science|| James Clark
|-
|Goalkeeper Coach|| Marlon Beresford
|-
|rowspan="2"|Physiotherapists || Phil Routledge
|-
|Dan Rowe
|-
|Kit Manager|| Malcolm Jobling
|-
|Kit Assistant|| Phil Marlow
|-

Honours

League 
Football Conference (Tier 5)
Runners-up: 1994–95, 1995–96
Conference South / National League South (Tier 6)
Champions (1): 2011–12 
Runners up: 2018–19
Play-off winners: 2018–19
Isthmian League (Tier 7)
Champions (1): 1991–92
Runners-up: 1956–57

Cups 
FA Trophy
Winners (3): 1993–94, 1994–95, 1996–97
Runners-up: 2005–06
Conference Cup/Bob Lord Challenge Trophy
Winners (1): 2004–05
Runners-up: 1997–98
FA Amateur Cup
Winners: 1957–58
Isthmian League Cup
Winners: 1991
Isthmian Charity Shield
Winners: 1992, 1993
London Senior Cup
Runners-up: 1983
Surrey Senior Cup
Winners (13): 1912–13, 1926–27, 1955–56, 1956–57, 1971–72, 1990–91, 1993–94, 1995–96, 1999–00, 2003–04, 2011–12, 2013–14, 2016–17
Runners up (16): 1897–98, 1907–08, 1909–10, 1910–11, 1927–28, 1934–35, 1945–46, 1958–59, 1970–71, 1977–78, 1980–81, 1986–87, 1988–89, 1997–98, 2001–02, 2008–09
Surrey Senior Charity Shield
Runners-up: 1932–33
Trevor Jones Memorial Trophy
Winners: 2011
Runners-up: 2009
Vauxhall Championship Shield
Winners: 1995
Runners-up: 1996

Club records
Highest league position:
2nd in Conference National: 1994–95 & 1995–96
FA Cup best performance:
Fourth Round: 1990–91
FA Trophy best performance:
Winners: 1993–94; 1994–95; 1996–97 (Joint record number of wins)
Largest transfer fee received
£150,000 for Kevin Betsy to Fulham in 1998
Largest transfer fee paid
£60,000 for Chris Sharpling from Crystal Palace in 2001
Record win
17–3 vs. Farnham in the Surrey Charity Shield in 1913
Heaviest defeat
0–16 vs. New Crusaders in the FA Cup in 1905
Record attendance
6,000 vs Swansea City, FA Cup, 19 December 1978; 6,000 vs Coventry City, FA Cup, 4 February 1997
Record home league attendance
5,171 vs Aldershot Town, National League, 2 January 2023

Former players
1. Players that have gone onto play in the football league or any foreign equivalent to this level (i.e. fully professional league).
2. Players with full international caps.
3. Players that hold a club record

 Reuben Agboola
 Nassim Akrour
 Bruno Andrade
 Louie Annesley
 Harry Arter
 Chris Arthur
 Adriano Basso
 Nathan Baxter
 Reece Beckles
 Kevin Betsy
 Narada Bernard
 Macauley Bonne
 Harvey Bradbury
 Bradley Bubb
 Matt Butcher
 Jefferson Louis
 Laurence Batty
 Sam Beasant
 James Bittner
 Jake Caprice
 Harry Cardwell
 Robbie Carroll
 Charlie Carter
 Mike Cestor
 Regan Charles-Cook
 James Clarke
 Jake Cole
 Paris Cowan-Hall
 Kadell Daniel
 Wilfried Domoraud
 Darryl Flahavan
 Steve Foster
 Simon Garner
 John Goddard
 Reece Grego-Cox
 Charlie Griffin
 Connor Hall
 Elvis Hammond
 Micah Hyde
 Dan Holman
 Rohan Ince
 Shwan Jalal
 Joey Jones
 Dennon Lewis
 Craig McAllister
 Terry McFlynn
 Jack Marriott
 Ben Morris
 Raphaël Nadé
 Adam Newton
 Cameron Norman
 Jason Norville
 John Nutter
 Luke Oliver
 Manny Oyeleke
 Ollie Palmer
 Josh Payne
 Joe Quigley
 Nathan Ralph
 Scott Rendell
 Justin Richards
 Mark Ricketts
 Lee Sawyer
 Steve Scrivens
 Tony Sinclair
 Jonté Smith
 Scott Smith
 Giuseppe Sole
 Lazar Stojsavljević
 Shwan Jalal
 Terell Thomas
 Christ Tiéhi
 Gozie Ugwu
 Joe Ward
 Joe Wollacott
 Ross Worner

References

External links

 
Football clubs in England
Football clubs in Surrey
Association football clubs established in 1887
1887 establishments in England
Surrey County Intermediate League (Western)
Isthmian League
National League (English football) clubs